is a Japanese politician of the Democratic Party of Japan and a member of the House of Councillors in the Diet (national legislature). A native of Kure, Hiroshima and graduate of Hitotsubashi University, he was elected for the first time in 1992.

References

External links 
  in Japanese.

Members of the House of Councillors (Japan)
1944 births
Living people
Hitotsubashi University alumni
People from Kure, Hiroshima
Democratic Party of Japan politicians